Michael McGarry (born 17 May 1965) was a successful association footballer who frequently represented New Zealand in the 1980s and 1990s.

Club career
His senior career began with Dunedin City and later Mosgiel, before he moved to Australia to join Sydney Olympic in the National Soccer League. He returned to New Zealand after a single season to join Christchurch United where he won back-to-back Jack Batty Memorial Trophies contesting the Chatham Cup final on the winning side in 1989 and the losing side in 1990.

International career
McGarry scored in his full All Whites début in a 4–2 win over Fiji on 17 September 1986 and ended his international playing career having pulled on the all white shirt 87 times, including 54 A-international caps in which he scored 12 goals, earning his final cap in a 0–5 loss to Indonesia on 21 September 1997.

Personal life 

He is the father of Willem II (football club)  and New Zealand Under-20 footballer James McGarry. Also a teacher at Otago Boys High School

References

External links 

1965 births
Living people
New Zealand association footballers
New Zealand international footballers
National Soccer League (Australia) players
Sydney Olympic FC players
People from Mosgiel
People educated at Taieri College
Association football midfielders
Dunedin City AFC players
1996 OFC Nations Cup players